Kes or KES may refer to:

Arts and entertainment
 Kes (band), a musical ensemble from Trinidad
 Kes (film), 1969 film directed by Ken Loach
 Kes (Star Trek), a fictional character in Star Trek: Voyager

Education
 Kellom Elementary School, an elementary school in the United States
 KES College, a college in Cyprus
 King Edward's School (disambiguation), several uses

Other uses
 Keş, a village in Azerbaijan
 Kes (Judaism), a rabbi in the Beta Israel community
 Willem Kes (1856–1934), Dutch conductor and violinist
 Kawabata evaluation system, a measure of the mechanical properties of fabrics
 Kelsey Airport, Canada, IATA airport code KES 
 Kenyan shilling, the currency of Kenya, ISO code KES
 Killer Elite Squad, a professional wrestling tag team
 Kristiania Elektriske Sporvei, a defunct tram company in Oslo, Norway
 Kesh (Sikhism), or kas, the uncut hair worn by members of the Sikh faith

See also
 
 Kesh (disambiguation)